"Nobody's Hero" is a song by Rush from their 1993 album Counterparts.

Nobody's Hero or Nobody's Heroes may also refer to:
Nobody's Heroes (album), a 1980 album by Stiff Little Fingers with a song by that name, that was covered several times e.g. by the Dropkick Murphys
"Nobody's Hero", a song by Raven from their 1981 album Rock Until You Drop
"Nobody's Hero", a song by Bon Jovi from their  2004 album 100,000,000 Bon Jovi Fans Can't Be Wrong
Nobody's Hero (film), a 1989 film starring Jing Chen and Kathy Chow Hoi-Mei